This article contains lists of Portland Parks & Recreation community gardens, organized by neighborhood, in the U.S. city of Portland, Oregon.

Context

The city of Portland has provided "gardening opportunities" since 1975, in the shape of 50 community gardens across the city. These are available on a "first-come, first-served basis".

The Friends of Portland Community Gardens describes itself as an "all-volunteer, nonprofit organization" with the mission of supporting community gardening opportunities for city residents.

GrowPortland operates (2015) five community gardens in the city, collaborating with "nonprofit, private and municipal landowners" to transform "underused spaces" into gardens.

The Portland Community Gardens project addressed the problem that the city's residents, schools and housing developments faced a long waiting list for garden plots; it received funding between 2010 and 2011 which enabled it to create 150 new garden plots, and further funding in 2012. The project has helped to plan new school/community gardens, and has liaised with other organizations to increase access to gardens, fund irrigation, and provide new school gardens. Food for Oregon, a community food programs database intended to increase local food security, describes the Portland Community Gardens project and gives its budget as $100,000-$499,999 annually.

The Portland organization "Growing Gardens" states that "We organize hundreds of volunteers to build organic, raised bed vegetable gardens in backyards, front yards, side yards and even on balconies", working with low income households, school garden clubs and community members to produce organic vegetables to get "at the root of hunger in Portland, Oregon".

Portland State University College of Urban and Public Affairs has compiled a map of community gardens in the Portland region, as part of a "Food System Sustainability Analysis".

North Portland

Northeast Portland

Northwest Portland

Southeast Portland

Southwest Portland

See also

 Community gardening in the United States
 List of parks in Portland, Oregon

References

External links

Portland, Oregon
Community gardens
Community gardens